The General Biographical Dictionary was a book written by American clergyman John Lauris Blake. The book's full title was A General Biographical Dictionary, Comprising a Summary Account of the Most Distinguished Persons of All Ages, Nations and Professions, including more than one thousand articles of American Biography.

Publication
The sixth edition, revised, was published by Alexander V. Blake of 77, Fulton Street, New York City in 1844.

Reception
The book was largely inspired by another book of the same name by a British author, the General Biographical Dictionary of Alexander Chalmers. However unlike Alexander Chalmers' book, John Lauris Blake's book largely focused on American persons and personalities. The book therefore was highly in demand in America in contrast to Chalmers' book which sold well only in Britain.

The book was printed several times and went through several editions. It was also translated into many languages.

The book was commonly found in the homes and libraries of American educators in the 19th century.

References
Ripley and Dana. New American Cyclopedia. 1863. Volume 3. Page 275. 1867. 1869.
(1840) 6 New York Review 249
(1841) 7 Southern Literary Messenger 247
(1839) 8 The New Yorker 221
(1840) 15  The Knickerbocker, or, New York Monthly Magazine 162

External links
A biographical dictionary at The Making of America
A biographical dictionary at Hathi Trust
A biographical dictionary at Google Books

1844 non-fiction books
Biographical dictionaries